Skillounta is a former municipality in Elis, West Greece, Greece. Since the 2011 local government reform it is part of the municipality Andritsaina-Krestena, of which it is a municipal unit. The municipal unit has an area of 194.409 km2. It is named after the ancient town Scillus, which was in the area. Its seat of administration was in the town Krestena. The territory of the municipal unit Skillounta stretches from the plains on the Ionian Sea coast to the forested mountains of southeastern Elis. The river Alfeios forms its northern border. Krestena is 6 km south of Olympia, 12 km north of Zacharo and 18 km southeast of Pyrgos. The Greek National Road 9/E55 (Patras - Pyrgos - Kyparissia) passes through Kallikomo in the western part of Skillounta, and the Greek National Road 76 to Andritsaina and Megalopoli runs west to east through Krestena and Graikas.

Subdivisions
The municipal unit Skillounta is subdivided into the following communities (constituent villages in brackets):
Diasella (Diasella, Ladikaki, Papa Chania, Skala)
Frixa (Frixa, Anemochoraki)
Graikas
Gryllos (Gryllos, Chani Gryllou)
Kallikomo (Kallikomo, Krounoi, Ladiko)
Kalyvakia (Nea Kalyvakia)
Kato Samiko (Kato Samiko, Kleidi, Fragkokklisia)
Krestena (Krestena, Moschoula, Poros)
Makrisia
Platiana
Ploutochori (Neo Chorio)
Raches
Samiko
Skillountia (Skillountia, Nea Skillountia)
Trypiti (Trypiti, Lekani)
Vrina

Sites of interest
Iardanos Tomb - near the village Kleidi, community of Kato Samiko. It was excavated in 1954 and contained 16 graves.

Population

See also
List of settlements in Elis

References

External links
Official website of Andritsaina-Krestena municipality

 
Populated places in Elis